Orin is an unincorporated community in Stevens County, in the U.S. state of Washington. It is located on the Colville River. U.S. Route 395 passes through the community.

History
A post office called Orin was established in 1902, and remained in operation until 1944. The community has the name of Orin S. Winslow.

References

Unincorporated communities in Stevens County, Washington
Unincorporated communities in Washington (state)